The England cricket team represents England and Wales in international cricket and is a full member of the International Cricket Council (ICC) with Test and One Day International (ODI) status. England is the joint oldest team in Test history, having played in the first ever Test match in 1877 against Australia. England and Australia also played the first ODI on 5 January 1971. England's first Twenty20 International (T20I) was played on 13 June 2005, once more against Australia. 

As of 28 December 2021, England has played 1043 Test matches, winning 378 and losing 314 (with 351 draws). The team has won The Ashes on 32 occasions, two fewer than their opponent, Australia. 

The team has played 761 ODIs to the same date, winning 384 and losing 339. 9 matches have been tied and 29 ended with no result. England's record in ODI tournaments includes winning the Cricket World Cup in 2019, as well as finishing as runners-up in 1979, 1987 and 1992. They also reached the finals of two ICC Champions Trophies (2004 and 2013). 

The team has played 134 Twenty20 Internationals, winning 69, losing 58, 2 tie+win and 5 no-results. The best T20I tournament result for England came when they won the ICC World Twenty20 in 2010, beating their rivals Australia in the final.

As of January 2021, England have faced ten teams in Test cricket, with their most frequent opponent being Ashes rivals, Australia; playing 351 matches against them. Due to playing more matches against them, they have registered the most wins (110) against Australia, but their best winning percentage is 90.00 against Bangladesh, having won 9 of 10 Tests. In ODI matches, England have played against 18 teams; they have played against Australia most frequently, with a winning percentage of 42.95 in 152 matches. Against the major ODI nations, England have defeated Pakistan on 56 occasions with a winning percentage of 63.63, which is their best record in ODIs. The team have competed against 11 countries in T20Is, and have played 21 matches against New Zealand.

Key

Test cricket

One Day International

Twenty20 International

Notes

References

Cricket records and statistics
England in international cricket